Vallanes is a village in the east of Iceland close to Egilsstaðir.

References

Populated places in Eastern Region (Iceland)